Steven Willem Lubbers (born 24 April 1953) is a former Dutch all-round cricketer and the first ODI captain for Netherlands. A right-handed batsman and right arm off-break bowler who captained the national side for some years and was the first man to take a wicket for the Netherlands in a One Day International.

Domestic career
Having appeared in minor matches for the Netherlands since 1972, Lubbers came to England in 1978 and played once for the Lancashire second XI and seven times for Derbyshire seconds, but failed to break through to the first team and never played first-class cricket, hindered by the fact that Dutch cricketers were back then considered overseas players, which was turned around a couple of years later.

International career
His first internationals were in the 1979 ICC Trophy, in which he appeared three times without any particular success. He also did little in the 1982 competition, but in the 1986 tournament he took 12 wickets at 19.75 and scored a fifty against Canada.

He became captain of the Dutch team in 1988, playing in the side that hosted an England XI the following year and taking the wickets of John Stephenson and Alec Stewart in a shock three-run victory at Amstelveen in the first of the two matches. A reasonable 1990 ICC Trophy followed, and he led two tours of England in 1991 and 1992, playing a total of eight minor games against county opposition, although seven were lost and one ruined by rain.

A good 1994 ICC Trophy (310 runs at 44.28, 10 wickets at 22.00) saw Lubbers make three half-centuries, including 81 in the third-place play-off victory over Bermuda; in all three games where he passed 50, the Netherlands reached at least 250. In the 1995 NatWest Trophy match against Northamptonshire he had Alan Fordham caught and bowled for 99, although the Dutch still lost by seven wickets.

Retirement
Lubbers ended his international career on a high note at the 1996 World Cup, where the Netherlands played their first ever ODIs. In the first of these, against New Zealand at Baroda, he took the first ever ODI wicket by a Dutchman when Craig Spearman was caught by Bas Zuiderent. (This was actually the second wicket to fall, as Nathan Astle had earlier been run out.) He struggled with batting, not scoring significant amounts in four attempts. His final game for his country was against South Africa, where Lubbers scored 2 not out and conceded 50 runs from eight wicketless overs as South Africa crushed the Dutch by 160 runs at Rawalpindi.

After cricket
Lubbers now works as a gymnastics teacher at a Deventer high school named Etty Hillesum Lyceum De Boerhaave.

In 2021 he was made a Knight of the Order of Oranje-Nassau.

Sports family
Steven Lubbers is the father of Dutch Olympic rower Reinder Lubbers.

References

External links
 
 

1953 births
Living people
Netherlands One Day International cricketers
Dutch cricket captains
Sportspeople from Deventer
Knights of the Order of Orange-Nassau
Dutch cricketers